The East Hesse Highlands describes a heavily wooded range of hills lying mainly in the German state of Hesse, but also extending a little way into Lower Saxony to the north, Thuringia to the east and Bavaria to the southeast. The region is sandwiched between the West Hesse Depression to the west, the Weser Uplands to the north, the Thuringian Basin to the northeast, the northwestern edge of the Thuringian Forest to the east, the Spessart to the south and the Wetterau to the southwest.

The East Hesse Highlands forms a natural region (no. 35 or D47) and is both part of the European Central Uplands as well as the Rhine-Weser watershed. It includes the Vogelsberg-Meißner Axis, also known as the Hessian Central Uplands, the East Hesse Depression and the Rhön.

The West and East Hesse Highlands together form the Hesse Highlands and correspond to the geological unit of the Hesse Depression in its wider sense, because geologically recent layers of Zechstein and Bunter sandstone, and in places even younger Muschelkalk rocks, from the lower Jurassic and Tertiary periods have been preserved here.

Natural divisions 
The Hesse Environmental Atlas distinguishes the following major geographical units (three-figure numbers):

 35 East Hesse Highlands
350  Lower Vogelsberg
 350.1  Northern Lower Vogelsberg
 350.2  Northwestern Lower Vogelsberg
 350.3  Eastern Lower Vogelsberg
 350.4  Western Lower Vogelsberg
 350.5  Southern Lower Vogelsberg
 350.6  Giesel Forest
 351  High Vogelsberg (including Oberwald)
 351.0  Western High Vogelsberg
 351.1  Eastern High Vogelsberg
 351.2  Oberwald
 352  Fulda Depression
 352.0 Fliede Valley
 352.1 Fulda Basin
 352.2 Großenlüder-Lauterbach Trough
 353  Vorderrhön and Kuppenrhön (including Landrücken)
 353.0  Landrücken
 353.1  Western Rhön Foreland
 353.2  Kuppenrhön
 353.3  Eastern Rhön Foreland
 354  Hohe Rhön
 354.0  Southern Hohe Rhön
 354.1  Hochrhön
 355  Fulda-Haune Plateau
 355.0  Ottrau Upland
 355.1  Schlitz Land
 355.2  Kämmerzell-Hersfeld Fulda Valley
 355.3  Haune Plateaus
 355.4  Kirchheim Upland
 356  Knüll Upland
 356.0  Western Knüll Foreland
 356.1  Eastern Knüll Foreland
 356.2  Hochknüll
 356.3  Homberg Upland
 357  Fulda-Werra Uplands
 357.0  Neuenstein-Ludwigseck Ridge
 357.1  Bebra-Melsungen Fulda Valley
 357.2  Solztrottenwald and Seulingswald
 357.3  Sontra Hills
 357.4  Stölzinger Upland (Stölzinger Hills)
 357.5  Witzenhausen-Altmorschen Valley
 357.6  Melsungen Upland (including Günsterode Heights)
 357.7  Kaufungen Forest (including Söhre)
 357.8  Meissen Region (including High Meissner)
 357.9  Sontra Upland (including Schlierbachswald)
 358  Lower Werra Uplands
 358.0  Lower Werra Saddle
 358.1  Treffurt-Wanfried Werra Valley
 358.2  Eschwege Basin
 358.3  Sooden-Allendorf Werra Valley
 358.4  Witzenhausen-Hedemünden Werra Valley
 358.5  Rosoppe-Frieda Bay
 358.6  Höheberg
 358.8  Neuseesen-Werleshausen Heights
 358.9  Sandwald
 359  Salzungen Werra Highlands
 359.0  Stadtlangsfeld Hills
 359.1  Salzungen-Herleshausen Werra Valley
 359.2  Frauensee Hills

Landscape characteristics 
The East Hesse Highlands is bounded immediately to the east by the West Hesse Highlands and Lowlands. Almost all of the region is formed by Bunter sandstone and this defines both its relief and the surface of the land apart from occasional layers of overlying volcanic basalt.

All the prominent ridges are, at least partly, characterised by volcanic features. Between the Hoher Meissner (754 m) and Kaufungen Forest (up to 643 m high) in the north, the Knüll (636 m) in the centre, the Vogelsberg (773 m) in the southwest and the Rhön (950 m) in the southeast, there are numerous individual singularities which catalogue the volcanic activity between the two Central Uplands regions.

Location of geographical units 

The northern part of this natural region includes the Fulda-Werra Uplands, with the Hoher Meissner and Kaufungen Forest, which descends to the Lower Werra Land in the northeast and into the Salzungen Werra Uplands in the southeast. In the southwest of the area are the Knüll Uplands, in the south the Fulda-Haune Plateau and in the southeast the Anterior Rhön and Kuppen Rhön (including the Landrücken) to the southeast, which run into the High Rhön still further to the southeast.

South of the Fulda-Haune Plateau and west of the Rhön are the Lower und High Vogelsberg hills, the former encircling the latter.

Hills (selection) 

Wasserkuppe (950.2 m, High Rhön)
Kreuzberg (927.8 m, Bavarian High Rhön)
Dammersfeldkuppe (927.9 m, Border of Hesse and Bavaria, High Rhön)
Heidelstein (925.7 m, Border of Hesse and Bavaria, High Rhön)
Milseburg (835.2 m, Kuppen Rhön)
Taufstein (773.0 m, High Vogelsberg)
Kasseler Kuppe (753.6 m, Hoher Meissner)
Gebaberg (750.7 m, in the east the Thuringian Anterior Rhön)
Pleß (645.4 m, Salzunger Werra Highlands)
Hirschberg (643 m, Söhre))
Bilstein (641.2 m, Kaufungen Forest)
Eisenberg (635.5 m, Knüll)
Knüllköpfchen (633.8 m, Knüll)
Rimberg (591.8 m, southeastern Knüll foothills in the Ottrau Highlands)

Rivers 

The central river in the area is the Fulda, which runs from south to north and leaves the East Hesse Highlands just before its confluence with the Werra in the West Hesse Depression. Left of the Fulda lie the Knüll and Vogelsberg, right of it the major part of the Fulda-Werra Highlands and the Rhön.

Right hand tributaries of the middle and lower reaches of the Schwalm, which lie almost entirely in the West Hesse Depression, drains the western part of the area, whilst left hand tributaries of the Werra drain the east. Only the source of the Schwalm and the mouth of the Werra lie within the Highlands themselves.

The tributaries are also north of the Rhine-Weser watershed, apart from the Ohm the only tributary of the Lahn, which is clearly oriented in a south-to-north direction, whilst the streams running into the Main tributaries of the Nidda, Kinzig and Franconian Saale flow south.

Table of most important rivers 

The most important rivers of the East Hesse Highlands are listed in the following table, in clockwise order, beginning on the north side of the Rhine-Weser watershed by the Vogelsberg.
For a better overview or to see them listed in a downstream order, by river system, enter the DGKZ numbers after the number of the parent river followed by a dash.
River names and lengths listed in italics are those which clearly leave the region of the East Hesse Highlands (depressions on the perimeter excluded), where catchment areas and discharges are given in italics, it indicates that part of the catchment area is external and has significant tributaries from outside the East Hesse Highlands (see the notes below the table). Main rivers are linked if they are entirely located outside the area.

(*: the source of the Haune lies, strictly speaking, still just in the Western Rhön Foreland, 353.1**: the Wehre rises, strictly speaking, in the Rommerode Hills, 357.53, the eastern foreland of the Söhre)***: the values for catchment area and discharge of the Taft are limited to the Hessian part and do not include its confluence area in Thuringia)

The following parts of the (catchment areas of the) rivers listed are not in the East Hesse Highlands:
 Antreff - entire middle and lower course in the Upper Hesse Ridge
 Schwalm - almost all left tributaries in various parts of the West Hesse Highlands; river lies on the western boundary of the area
 Fulda - mouth lies on the northwestern border; left tributaries above the Eder lie outside; of the catchment area of the Eder, which is largely in the Rest-Fulda catchment area, only the right-hand tributaries of the Schwalm come from the East Hesse Highlands, whilst the Eder is fed by the West Hesse Highlands apart from the upper course which is fed by the Süder Uplands.
 Streu - lower course in the Grabfeld
 Brend - middle and lower reaches lie, without major tributaries, in the part of the Südrhön belonging to the Spessart region
 Sinn - middle and lower courses lie in various parts of the Spessart
 Bracht and Seemenbach - lower courses lie, without major tributaries, in the Büdingen Forest region of the Spessart
 Nidder - from the Seemenbach it runs along the eastern boundary of the Wetterau to the Ronneburg Hills, but without any major tributaries
 Horloff - middle and lower reaches on the southeastern boundary; (only moderately sized) right tributaries from the Wetterau
 Nidda - from the confluence with the Horloff it runs into the Wetterau; where it is joined by the Wetter and Nidder
 Wetter - leaves the East Hesse Highlands shortly after its source and nimmt draws water from, inter alia, the Taunus.
 Ohm - from the confluence with the Felda it runs through various parts of the West Hesse Highlands

See also 
 Natural regions of Germany
 West Hesse Highlands
 West Hesse Depression

References

General sources 
LAGIS: Geological map of Hesse
 BfN
 Map services
 Landscape fact file (by major units)
 350 (Lower Vogelsberg)
 Lower Vogelsberg
 Giesel Forest (including "Fulda Foreland of the Vogelsberg")
 351 (High Vogelsberg)
 High Vogelsberg 
 352 (Fuldaer Senke)
 Fulda Depression
 353 (Vorder- and Kuppenrhön (including Landrücken))
 Landrücken and Western Rhön Foreland
 Kuppenrhön
 Eastern Rhön Foreland
 354 (Hohe Rhön)
 Hohe Rhön
 355 (Fulda-Haune Plateau)
 Fulda-Haune Plateau (excluding Fulda Valley)
 Kämmerzell-Hersfeld Fulda Valley
 356 (Knüll-Upland)
 Knüll (excluding Homberg Upland)
 Homberg Upland
 357 (Fulda-Werra-Highlands)
 Fulda-Werra Highlands (excluding Kaufungen Forest, Meißner Region and Fulda Valley)
 Meißner Region
 Kaufungen Forest (excluding Söhre)
 Bebra-Melsungen Fulda Valley
 358 (Lowe WerraHighlands)
 Lower Werra Country (excluding Lowe Werra Valley)
 Sooden-Allendorf and Witzenhausen-Hedemünden Werra Valley
 359 (Salzunger WerraHighlands'')
 Salzungen Werra Highlands (excluding Werra Valley)
 Salzungen-Herleshausen Werra Valley

External links 

  of the East Hesse Highlands

Natural regions of the Central Uplands
Central Uplands
Regions of Hesse
East Hesse
Highlands